Fènghuáng are mythological birds found in Sinospheric mythology that reign over all other birds. The males were originally called fèng and the females huáng, but this distinction of gender is often no longer made and they are blurred into a single feminine entity so that the bird can be paired with the Chinese dragon, which is traditionally deemed male.

In the Western world, it is commonly called the Chinese phoenix or simply phoenix, although mythological similarities with the Western phoenix are superficial.

Appearance

A common depiction of fenghuang was of it attacking snakes with its talons and its wings spread. According to the Erya's chapter 17 Shiniao, fenghuang is made up of the beak of a rooster, the face of a swallow, the forehead of a fowl, the neck of a snake, the breast of a goose, the back of a tortoise, the hindquarters of a stag and the tail of a fish. Today, however, it is often described as a composite of many birds including the head of a golden pheasant, the body of a mandarin duck, the tail of a peacock, the legs of a crane, the mouth of a parrot, and the wings of a swallow.

The fenghuang's body symbolizes the celestial bodies: the head is the sky, the eyes are the sun, the back is the moon, the wings are the wind, the feet are the earth, and the tail is the planets. The fenghuang is said to have originated in the sun. Its body contains the five fundamental colors: black, white, red, yellow, and green. It sometimes carries scrolls or a box with sacred books. It is sometimes depicted with a fireball. It is believed that the bird only appears in areas or places that are blessed with utmost peace and prosperity or happiness.

Chinese tradition cites it as living atop the Kunlun Mountains in northern China.

Origin

The earliest known ancient phoenix design dates back to about 7000–8000 years ago and was discovered in Hongjiang, Hunan Province, at the Gaomiao Archeological Site. The earliest known form of dragon-phoenix design, on the other hand, dates back to the Yangshao culture (c. 5000 – c. 3000 BC) and was found at an archeological site near Xi'an in Shaanxi Province. This ancient usage of phoenix and dragon designs are all evidence of an ancient form of totemism in China. 

During the Shang dynasty, phoenix and dragon images appear to have become popular as burial objects. Several archeological artifacts of jade phoenix and jade dragons were unearthed in tombs dating from the Shang dynasty period.

During the Spring and Autumn period (c. 771 BC – c. 476 BC) and the Warring States period, common form of unearthed artifacts are the combination of dragon-phoenix designs together. One of such artifacts is the Silk Painting of Human Figure with Dragon and Phoenix, which shows such combination of dragon and phoenix images. 

In Qin dynasty (221–206 BC), phoenix hairpins (i.e. hairpins with fenghuang decorations) and shoes which were also decorated with phoenix designs were supposed to be worn by the Imperial concubines of the Qin Emperor. 

During the Han dynasty (2,200 years ago) two phoenixes, one a male (feng) and the other a female (huang) were often shown together facing one other. In the Han dynasty, an imperial edict decreed that the phoenix hairpins had to become the formal headpiece for the empress dowager and the imperial grandmother.

Later, during the Yuan dynasty the two terms were merged to become fenghuang, but the "King of Birds" came to symbolize the empress when paired with a dragon representing the emperor.  

From the Jiajing era (1522–66) of the Ming dynasty onwards, a pair of phoenixes was differentiated by the tail feathers of the two birds, typically together forming a closed circle patternthe male identified by five long serrated tail feathers or "filaments" (five being an odd, masculine, or yang number) and the female by what sometimes appears to be one but is in fact usually two curling or tendrilled tail feathers (two being an even, feminine, or yin number). Also during this period, the fenghuang was used as a symbol representing the direction south. This was portrayed through a male and female facing each other. Their feathers were of the five fundamental colors: black, white, red, green, and yellow. These colours are said to represent Confucius' five virtues:
Ren: the virtue of benevolence, charity, and humanity;
Yi: honesty and uprightness; Yì may be broken down into zhōng, doing one's best, conscientiousness, loyalty and shù: the virtue of reciprocity, altruism, consideration for others
Zhi: knowledge
Xin: faithfulness and integrity;
Li: correct behavior, propriety, good manners, politeness, ceremony, worship.

The phoenix represented power sent from the heavens to the Empress. If a phoenix was used to decorate a house it symbolized that loyalty and honesty were in the people that lived there.  Or alternatively, a phoenix only stays when the ruler is without darkness and corruption.

Meaning

The fenghuang has positive connotations. It is a symbol of virtue and grace. The fenghuang also symbolizes the union of yin and yang. The first chapter of the Classic of Mountains and Seas , the "Nanshang-jing", states that each part of fenghuang's body symbolizes a word. The head represents virtue, the wing represents duty, the back represents propriety, the abdomen represents credibility and the chest represents mercy.

The fenghuang originally consisted of a separate male feng and a female huang as symbols of yin and yang. The male feng represented the yang aspect while the huang represented the yin aspect; and together, the feng and huang image was symbolic of love between husband and wife. However, since the Qin dynasty, the fenghuang progressively went through a feminization process as the dragon became a symbol of masculinity. Eventually the feng and the huang merged into a single female entity. 

In ancient and modern Chinese culture, fenghuang can often be found in the decorations for weddings or royalty, along with dragons. This is because the Chinese considered the dragon-and-phoenix design symbolic of blissful relations between husband and wife, another common yang and yin metaphor. In some traditions it appears in good times but hides during times of trouble, while in other traditions it appeared only to mark the beginning of a new era. In China and Japan it was a symbol of the imperial house, and it represented "fire, the sun, justice, obedience, and fidelity".

Modern usage 
The phoenix is still used in modern Japan and Korea in relation to the head of state:
Japan: The Hōō (the Japanese pronunciation of 鳳凰) is associated with the Japanese Imperial family. The seemingly vast difference between hōō and fenghuang is due to Chinese vowels with ng usually being converted to ō in go-on reading. Examples include:
 The actual Imperial throne  is adorned by numerous Hōōs.
 The Imperial custume Kōrozen no Gohō is decorated by numerous textile patterns including a pair of Hōō.
 Various Japanese stamps and currency, such as the back of the current series E (2004) ¥10,000 yen note. 
 Toyota's flagship vehicle favored by the Japanese Imperial family and high Japanese government officials, the Toyota Century, uses the Hōō as an identifying emblem. 
Korea: two bonghwang (Korean pronunciation of 鳳凰) are used in the symbol of the Korean President. Historically the bonghwang was used for queens and empresses.

Other uses include:
 Fèng or Fènghuáng is a common element in given names of Chinese women (likewise, "Dragon" is used for men's names).
 "Dragon-and-phoenix infants" is a Chinese term for a set of male and female fraternal twins.
Fenghuang is a common place name throughout China. The best known is Fenghuang County in western Hunan, southern China, formerly a sub-prefecture. Its name is written with the same Chinese characters as the mythological bird.
 Phoenix talons is a Chinese term for chicken claws in any Chinese dish cooked with them.
The Vermilion Bird, (Suzaku in Japanese) one of the Four Symbols of Chinese myth, sometimes equated with the fenghuang.
 The Chinese University of Hong Kong (CUHK) uses it in its emblem to symbol nobility, beauty, loyalty and majesty.
 Phoenix Television is a Hong Kong-based media company
 Typhoon Fung-wong has been a meteorological name for three tropical cyclones. The term was contributed by Hong Kong and is the Cantonese pronunciation of fenghuang.
When describing chinoiserie or authentic Asian ceramics and other artworks, English-speaking art historians and antique collectors sometimes refer to it as "hoho bird," a name derived from hōō, with a second extraneous h added. The Japanese also use the word fushichō for this image.

See also 
 Birds in Chinese mythology
Chinese mythology
 Four Holy Beasts
 Byōdō-in, Buddhist temple in Japan
 Byodo-In Temple, Buddhist temple in Oʻahu, Hawaiʻi
 Firebird in Russian mythology
 Ho-Oh
 Huma bird in Persian mythology
 Phoenix (manga)
 Phoenix (mythology)
 Phoenix Program, Vietnam War operation by the US
 Phoenix Mountain, a mountain in Zhejiang, China
 Simurgh, an Iranian mythological bird identifiable with the phoenix

References

External links

 

Mythological and legendary Chinese birds
East Asian legendary creatures
Four benevolent animals
Japanese legendary creatures
Korean legendary creatures
Legendary birds
Phoenix birds
Yangshao culture